KJMH (107.5 FM, branded as "107 Jamz") is a radio station broadcasting an urban contemporary format. Licensed to Lake Arthur, Louisiana, United States, the station serves Lake Charles and the surrounding Southwest Louisiana area. The station is currently owned by Townsquare Media and licensed to Townsquare Media Lake Charles License, LLC.  The station's studios are located on North Lakeshore Drive, just northwest of downtown Lake Charles, and its transmitter is located southeast of Iowa, Louisiana.

History
In 1997, Lafayette's KRXZ now KHXT switched frequencies from 107.7 to 107.9, opening up the door for a new station in Lake Charles to be operated at 107.5 MHz without any interference. Progressive Communications, Inc. filed for a full power station at 107.5 and was granted one by the Federal Communications Commission (FCC) within weeks. After months of construction, the station finally signed on the air on October 10, 1997, as "Krawfish 107" with the callsigns KRAW.

Sometime in 2000, Krawfish 107, along with sister stations LA99 (now Gator 99.5), KJEF 92.9 (now 92-9 The Lake) and KJEF 1290 AM were sold to Apex Broadcasting, Inc., a small radio station company based in South Carolina.

On August 1, 2000, Apex Broadcasting flipped 107.5 from Country to Urban Contemporary as "V107.5" with the callsigns changed to KVEE.

There are many reasons why the format was switched. Krawfish 107 was likely put on the air only to cut into Kicks 96's ratings. It was basically all just to cover for LA99; Krawfish 107's sister station. LA99 was always the popular AC station in Lake Charles, beating out B104 (now Rhythmic Top 40 Hot 103.3) but never Kicks 96. And for Progressive Communications, Inc. to put Country on 107.5 would be a win-win situation to keep those ratings going to LA99.

On February 26, 2004, the format was changed again, as "107 Jamz" with the callsigns changed to KJMH and expanding the format to include Hip Hop.

In 2008, Apex Broadcasting sold the station, along with sister stations KHLA, KJEF, KLCL, KNGT, and KTSR to Gap Broadcasting, LLC.  What eventually became Gap Central Broadcasting (following the formation of GapWest Broadcasting) was folded into Townsquare Media on August 13, 2010.

References

External links

JMH
Urban contemporary radio stations in the United States
Townsquare Media radio stations